The 1982 Skate America was held in Lake Placid, New York on October 6–10. Medals were awarded in the disciplines of men's singles, ladies' singles, pair skating, and ice dancing.

Results

Men

Ladies

Pairs

Ice dancing

External links
 Skate Canada results
 Worlds Results incl. Skate America 1982

Skate America, 1982
Skate America